Stjørdal Station is a railway station located in the town of Stjørdalshalsen in the municipality of Stjørdal in Trøndelag county, Norway.  The station is located along the Nordland Line. It is located just north of the intersection of the E14 and E6 highways.  The station serves both local and express trains northbound to Innherred and Nordland and southbound to Trondheim. The Trøndelag Commuter Rail between Steinkjer and Trondheim stops here hourly.

History

The station was opened on 1 October 1902 on the Hell–Sunnan Line between Hell Station and Levanger Station as the section to Stjørdal was finished. It was built based upon a design by Paul Armin Due. Prior to 1 June 919, the station was named Stjørdalen, since then it has been called Stjørdal.

References

Railway stations in Stjørdal
Railway stations on the Nordland Line
Railway stations opened in 1902
1902 establishments in Norway
National Romantic architecture in Norway
Art Nouveau railway stations